Marcia Bakry (born 1937) is an American artist and the scientific illustrator for the Smithsonian's National Museum of Natural History's Department of Anthropology.

Her illustrations are included in various academic books and scholarly articles. Books featuring her work include Mississippian Communities and Households, Handbook of North American Indians, V. 12, Plateau, and  Anthropology Explored, Second Edition. Her art was shown at the 2017 Artists at Work exhibition at the Smithsonian's S. Dillon Ripley Center.

References

Living people
Scientific illustrators
Smithsonian Institution people
American women illustrators
American illustrators
20th-century American artists
20th-century American women artists
21st-century American artists
21st-century American women artists
1937 births